The Central Regional School District is a regional public school district in Ocean County, New Jersey, United States, which serves students in seventh through twelfth grades from the municipalities of Berkeley Township, Island Heights, Ocean Gate, Seaside Heights and Seaside Park.

As of the 2021–22 school year, the district, comprised of two schools, had an enrollment of 2,414 students and 177.2 classroom teachers (on an FTE basis), for a student–teacher ratio of 13.6:1.

The district is classified by the New Jersey Department of Education as being in District Factor Group "B", the second-lowest of eight groupings. District Factor Groups organize districts statewide to allow comparison by common socioeconomic characteristics of the local districts. From lowest socioeconomic status to highest, the categories are A, B, CD, DE, FG, GH, I and J.

History
The district was established in September 1954 with Berkeley Township, Island Heights, Lacey Township, Ocean Gate, Seaside Heights and Seaside Park as the constituent municipalities.

Students from the six constituent municipalities had previously attended the Toms River Regional Schools, before the new district completed its school building that was constructed on a site covering  at a cost of $1,430,000 (equivalent to $ million in ). The school opened to students in September 1956 as Central Regional Junior-Senior High School with students from the six constituent municipalities, along with students from Brick Township, who attended as part of a sending/receiving relationship. The formal dedication was deferred to late February 1957 due to construction delays.

With the withdrawal of grades 7 and 8 starting in the 1980–81 school year and the opening of Lacey Township High School in 1981, Lacey Township began dissolving its participation in the Central Regional district.

Schools 
Schools in the district (with 2021–22 enrollment data from the National Center for Education Statistics) are:
Central Regional Middle School with 772 students in grades 7 and 8
Joseph F. Firetto, Principal
Central Regional High School with 1,619 students in grades 9 - 12
Irene P. Marousis, Principal

Administration
Core members of the district's administration are:
Douglas Corbett, Acting Superintendent
Kevin O'Shea, Business Administrator / Board Secretary

A 14-year-old female student committed suicide in February 2023 after videos of her being physically attacked in a hallway of the school surfaced online. The student's father believes that public humiliation and continued online bullying after this event spurred his daughter to end her own life. Later that month, Superintendent Triantafillos Parlapanides resigned after it was reveled that he had disclosed private information about the student to a UK newspaper; the district named Douglas Corbett, an assistant superintendent and former principal, as acting superintendent.

Board of education
The district's board of education, comprised of nine members, sets policy and oversees the fiscal and educational operation of the district through its administration. As a Type II school district, the board's trustees are elected directly by voters to serve three-year terms of office on a staggered basis, with three seats up for election each year held (since 2012) as part of the November general election. The board appoints a superintendent to oversee the district's day-to-day operations and a business administrator to supervise the business functions of the district. Seats on the board of education are allocated based on the population of the constituent municipalities, with five seats assigned to Berkeley Township, and one each to Island Heights, Ocean Gate, Seaside Heights and Seaside Park.

References

External links 
Central Regional School District

Data for the Central Regional School District, National Center for Education Statistics

1954 establishments in New Jersey
Berkeley Township, New Jersey
Island Heights, New Jersey
New Jersey District Factor Group B
Ocean Gate, New Jersey
School districts in Ocean County, New Jersey
Seaside Heights, New Jersey
Seaside Park, New Jersey
School districts established in 1954